Federico Xavier Azcárate Ochoa (born 15 June 1984) is an Argentine footballer who plays as a central defender.

Club career
Born in Balcarce, Buenos Aires, Azcárate moved as a youngster to Spain, first representing lowly FC Cartagena. In 2003, he joined newly promoted club Real Murcia, but would only appear in a combined nine games over two seasons, the first spent in La Liga and the second in the second division.

From 2005 to 2007, Azcárate represented Atlético Madrid, but never made it past their reserves which competed in the third level. After spending an unassuming campaign in Greece with AEK Athens F.C. he returned to Spain, joining third-tier Polideportivo Ejido.

In 2010, after two seasons in Andalusia, Azcárate switched to another team in that league, CD Leganés. He was released at the end of 2011–12.

References

External links

1984 births
Living people
People from Balcarce Partido
Argentine people of Basque descent
Sportspeople from Buenos Aires Province
Argentine footballers
Association football defenders
La Liga players
Segunda División players
Segunda División B players
FC Cartagena footballers
Real Murcia players
Atlético Madrid B players
Polideportivo Ejido footballers
CD Leganés players
Super League Greece players
AEK Athens F.C. players
Primera Nacional players
Club y Biblioteca Ramón Santamarina footballers
Club Atlético Douglas Haig players
Argentine expatriate footballers
Expatriate footballers in Spain
Expatriate footballers in Greece
Argentine expatriate sportspeople in Spain
Argentine expatriate sportspeople in Greece